White County is a county located in the U.S. state of Tennessee. As of the 2020 census, the population was 27,351. Its county seat is Sparta.

History

On September 11, 1806, an act of the Tennessee General Assembly created White County out of Smith and Jackson counties, responding to a petition signed by 155 residents of the area. The county's original geographic area included all of what are now White and Warren counties, as well as parts of modern Cannon, Coffee, DeKalb, Franklin, Grundy, Putnam, and Van Buren counties.

The origin of the county's name is disputed. The county is officially held to be named for John White (1751–1846), a Revolutionary War soldier, surveyor, and frontiersman who was the first known white settler of the area. White had moved his family to the Cumberland Mountains from Virginia in 1789. However, some historians suggest the county was named for Revolutionary War soldier James White, the founder of Knoxville.

A temporary county seat was established near Rock Island, now in Warren County. Three years later a permanent county seat was established on the banks of the Calfkiller River and named Sparta.

In 1840, White County became a destination for people from all over the country when Christopher Haufmann erected a large hotel on Bon Air Mountain, part of the Cumberland Plateau. The hotel was near some mineral springs as well as being at a high altitude; both were thought to promote health, and people came from far and wide for the "cures" advertised by the resort.

White County was the site of a very large saltpeter mining operation during the Civil War.  The Cave Hill Saltpeter Pits (No. 1 and No. 2), located on Cave Hill near the mouth of England Cove, were intensively mined. Relics remain from that operation.  Saltpeter is the main ingredient of gunpowder and was obtained by leaching the earth from these caves.

The Civil War deeply affected White County, although no major battles were fought in the area. As it was on the border between the largely pro-Union East Tennessee and pro-Confederate Middle Tennessee, the county was the scene of bloodshed from partisans (called "bushwhackers") of both sides. One famous Confederate guerrilla operating in the area was Champ Ferguson, who caused much mayhem and destruction before he was arrested after the war on May 28, 1865.  Ferguson was tried by a military court, convicted and executed by hanging, one of only two Confederates executed for war crimes. He is buried in France Cemetery near Sparta.

Over the subsequent decades, White County slowly rebuilt from the ashes of war. The county was connected to the outside world by railroad, mainly because of the booming coal mining industries being started on Bon Air Mountain. The mountain was rich in bituminous coal, and enterprising local businessmen were quick to realize the profit potential that represented. Several mining towns sprang up on the plateau part of the county, including Bon Air, Eastland, and Ravenscroft.

In 1981, a dispute between a local mining company and residents escalated and later became a Tennessee Supreme Court case known as Doochin v. Rackley. The disagreement began when the local coal companies began to strip mine residents' private land. The court ruled in favor of the defendants because the Broad Form Deed did not recognize strip mining as a legal form of mining.

Geography

The eastern part of the county lies atop the Cumberland Plateau, while the western portion is situated on the Highland Rim, at a lower elevation. The Plateau Escarpment is visible from much of the western part of the county.

The Caney Fork, the county's primary drainage, flows across the southern portion of the county, and forms part the county's border with Van Buren, Warren and DeKalb.  The river descends from the Cumberland Plateau to the Highland Rim through Scott's Gulf, a dramatic gorge noted for scenic waterfalls, most notably the  Virgin Falls.  The section of the Caney Fork in southern White County is part of Great Falls Lake, an artificial reservoir created by Great Falls Dam at Rock Island State Park.  Downstream from this dam, the river enters a second reservoir, Center Hill Lake.

The Calfkiller River, a tributary of the Caney Fork, flows through the central part of White County, and drains the county seat, Sparta.  The Falling Water River, also a tributary of the Caney Fork, flows through the northwestern part of the county, and forms part of the county's border with Putnam County.  The Falling Water River is noted for its  waterfall, Burgess Falls, which straddles the Putnam-White line.

White County also boasts over 1,200 documented caves (over 3.17 caves per square mile), which makes White County one of the most cave-dense regions in the world.

Adjacent counties

Putnam County (north)
Cumberland County (east)
Bledsoe County (southeast)
Van Buren County (south)
Warren County (southwest)
DeKalb County (west)

Blue Spring Cave

The footprints of extinct Pleistocene (Ice Age) jaguars were discovered in the cave in 1990 by Bill Walter.

Major highways

State protected areas

Bledsoe State Forest (part)
Bridgestone/Firestone Centennial Wilderness Wildlife Management Area (part)
Burgess Falls State Park and Natural Area (part)
Rock Island State Park (part)
Sparta Rock House State Historic Site
Virgin Falls State Natural Area

Demographics

2020 census

As of the 2020 United States census, there were 27,351 people, 10,048 households, and 6,904 families residing in the county.

2000 census
As of the census of 2000, there were 23,102 people, 9,229 households, and 6,774 families residing in the county.  The population density was 61 people per square mile (24/km2).  There were 10,191 housing units at an average density of 27 per square mile (10/km2).  The racial makeup of the county was 96.63% White, 1.64% Black or African American, 0.20% Native American, 0.23% Asian, 0.05% Pacific Islander, 0.46% from other races, and 0.79% from two or more races.  1.03% of the population were Hispanic or Latino of any race.

There were 9,229 households, out of which 30.40% had children under the age of 18 living with them, 58.50% were married couples living together, 10.80% had a female householder with no husband present, and 26.60% were non-families. 23.40% of all households were made up of individuals, and 10.80% had someone living alone who was 65 years of age or older.  The average household size was 2.47 and the average family size was 2.90.

In the county, the population was spread out, with 23.50% under the age of 18, 7.90% from 18 to 24, 27.90% from 25 to 44, 25.40% from 45 to 64, and 15.30% who were 65 years of age or older.  The median age was 39 years. For every 100 females there were 96.20 males.  For every 100 females age 18 and over, there were 92.40 males.

The median income for a household in the county was $29,383, and the median income for a family was $34,854. Males had a median income of $26,706 versus $20,346 for females. The per capita income for the county was $14,791.  About 11.20% of families and 14.30% of the population were below the poverty line, including 16.90% of those under age 18 and 13.90% of those age 65 or over.

Education

Public schools 
White County High School
White County Middle School
BonDeCroft Elementary School
Cassville Elementary School
Central View Elementary School
Doyle Elementary School
Findlay Elementary School
Northfield Elementary School
Woodland Park Elementary School

Communities

City
 Sparta

Town
 Doyle

Unincorporated communities
Bon Air
 Darkey Springs 
DeRossett
 Macedonia
Quebeck
Ravenscroft
 Shady Grove
Walling
Yankeetown

Notable people
 David Culley - National Football League head coach
 George Gibbs Dibrell – U.S. Congressman and Confederate general
 Champ Ferguson – Confederate guerrilla
 Lester Flatt – bluegrass guitarist and mandolinist, best known for his collaboration with banjo picker Earl Scruggs in "The Foggy Mountain Boys"
 Kellie Harper – women's basketball head coach at the University of Tennessee Lady Vols - formerly (North Carolina State and Missouri State University) and a graduate of White County High School
 Benny Martin – bluegrass musician; invented the eight-string fiddle
 Carl Rowan – journalist, author, U.S. Ambassador to Finland
 Pauline Weaver – Arizona mountain man, born in White County
 Earl Webb – Major League Baseball record holder for most doubles in a season

Politics

See also
National Register of Historic Places listings in White County, Tennessee

References

External links

Sparta-White County Chamber of Commerce
White County Schools
White County TNGenWeb 
White County landforms
Tennessee Department of Transportation Map of White County

 
1806 establishments in Tennessee
Populated places established in 1806
Counties of Appalachia
Middle Tennessee